Silicon Savannah is a term used to refer to the technology ecosystem in Kenya. The term is a play on Silicon Valley and the grassland savanna ecosystem that is a dominant feature of Kenya's ecology.  It is known for producing the social enterprise M-kopa.

Konza Technology City
This term became associated with Konza Technology City, a planned urban development in Machakos and Makueni counties that would focus on offering services related to information technology to support tech entrepreneurs in Kenya.

References

High-technology business districts in Africa